Bak Gyusu (1807–1877) was a scholar-bureaucrat, teacher, politician, and a diplomat of the Joseon Dynasty. He was known as a pioneer of the enlightenment group. Bak Gyusu was the grandson of Park Ji-won, the great Silhak scholar of the Joseon. He was also known by the names of Hwanjae (환재, 瓛齋), Hwanjae (환재, 桓齋) en Heonjae (헌재, 獻齋), and Hwanjaegeosa (환재거사  瓛齋居士).

Life
In 1827, Bak Gyusu met Crown Prince Hyomyeong who quickly became a trusted friend. The Crown Prince would often ask Gyusu for his thoughts on delicate political and social issues. When the Crown Prince died three years later at the age of 20, Gyusu fell into a deep state of mourning. Due to this, Gyusu isolated himself from the outside world for twenty years.

In 1848, he successfully passed the Gwageo civil service exam, a test required for government work. Doing well on this test allowed Bak Gyusu to acquire a well-paid job early on. Later in his life, Gyusu became a mentor for a Korean politician Pak Yung-hio during the mid-1870s. Gyusu decided to instruct Pak Yung-hio in his ways of enlightened thinking after he took initiative and sought the politician out. Gyusu's ideas influenced many throughout Korea, the most notable being the Korean reformist Kim Okgyun, who went on to incorporate foreign sciences and technologies into Korea in an attempt to strengthen it against further military advances by the rapidly technologically developing Meiji Japan.

During the period of King Gojong's reign, the Queen actively supported him. Queen Sinjeong had been the wife of Crown Prince Hyomyeong, who was posthumously named King Munjo.  Bak Gyusu was the governor of Pyongan province when the General Sherman incident occurred, an event commonly cited as a factor important to the end of Korean isolationism in the 19th century. On the 9th of July 1866, the General Sherman entered the Keupsa Gate without permission. Gyusu gave the General Sherman's crew a warning to depart from Joseon. The ship's crew ignored his warning and captured the messenger adjutant-general Yi Hyon-Ik, a subordinate of Bak Gyusu. Gyusu was present during the rescue of Yi and the destruction of the General Sherman on the 24th of July 1866. In 1872 Bak Gyusu was made the Joseon Chief Envoy to the court of the Tongzhi Emperor.

Known Works 
 Hwanjaejip(환재집 瓛齋集)
 Hwanjaejikgye(환재직계 瓛齋織啓)
 Hwanjaesyugye(환재수계 瓛齋繡啓)
 Geogajapbokgo(거가잡복고 居家雜服攷)
 Sanggodohoimunuirye(상고도회문의례 尙古圖會文儀例)
 Jangammungo(장암문고 莊菴文稿)
 Hwanjaeyugo(환재유고 瓛齋遺稿)

Notes

References
 Daehwan, Noh.  "The Eclectic Development of Neo-Confucianism and Statecraft from the 18th to the 19th Century," Korea Journal (Winter 2003).  
 Kang, Jae-eun and Suzanne Lee. (2006). The Land of Scholars: Two Thousand Years of Korean Confucianism. Paramus, New Jersey: Homa & Sekey Books. ; OCLC 60931394

External links 
 Bak Gyusu  
 "서양 오랑캐가 중국 문명에 감화될 것이니…" 프레시안 2010.04.09  
 “한국 첫 개화사상가 오경석 아닌 박규수” 문화일보 2011.03.10  
 이 남자, 네 가지로 모든 걸 해결했다 

1807 births
1877 deaths
Joseon scholar-officials
Korean scholars
Korean Confucianists
19th-century Korean philosophers
Neo-Confucian scholars
Korean educators
19th-century Korean poets
Korean politicians
Korean diplomats
People from Seoul